Niceforonia araiodactyla is a species of frog in the family Strabomantidae endemic to Peru. Its natural habitat is subtropical or tropical high-altitude shrubland.

References

araiodactyla
Amphibians of Peru
Amphibians of the Andes
Endemic fauna of Peru
Taxonomy articles created by Polbot
Amphibians described in 1999